The 2016 Horizon League men's soccer season is the 24th season of men's varsity soccer in the conference.

The UIC Flames are the defending regular season champions, and the Oakland Golden Grizzlies are the defending tournament champions.

Changes from 2015 

 Paul Doroh joins the Oakland Golden Grizzlies coaching staff.

Teams

Stadiums and locations

Regular season

Rankings

NSCAA National

NSCAA Great Lakes Regional

Postseason

Horizon League Tournament

NCAA tournament

All-Horizon League awards and teams

See also 
 2016 NCAA Division I men's soccer season
 2016 Horizon League Men's Soccer Tournament
 2016 Horizon League women's soccer season

References 

 
2016 NCAA Division I men's soccer season